The 1977 Little All-America college football team is composed of college football players from small colleges and universities who were selected by the Associated Press (AP) as the best players at each position.

First team

Offense
 Tight end - Kevin Cummings, Massachusetts
 Wide receivers -  Terry Hutt, Boise State; Steve Kreider, Lehigh
 Offensive tackles -  Harold Cotton, Boise State; Grady Vigneau, New Hampshire
 Offensive guards - Steve Head, Kutztown State; Tyrone McGriff, Florida A&M
 Center - Frank Bouressa, Lawrence
 Quarterback - Reed Giordana, Wisconsin-Stevens Point
 Running backs - Bill Burnham, New Hampshire; Larry Collins, Texas A&I

Defense
 Defensive ends - Bill Matthews, South Dakota State; John Mohring, C.W. Post
 Defensive tackles - Jesse Baker, Jacksonville (AL) State; Barry Bennett, Concordia (MN)
 Middle guard - Ray Allred, Idaho State
 Linebackers - Bob Bible, Austin Peay; Steve Cockerham, Akron; Rusty Rebowe, Nicholls State
 Defensive backs - Louis Blanton, Southwestern Oklahoma; Mitch Brown, St. Lawrence; Frank Dark, Virginia Union

See also
 1977 College Football All-America Team

References

Little All-America college football team
Little All-America college football team
Little All-America college football team
Little All-America college football teams